"Song for the Summer" is a song by Welsh rock band Stereophonics. It was released on 27 November 2015 as the third single from their ninth studio album Keep the Village Alive.  Lead-singer and guitarist Kelly Jones said of the track "I was in bed one Sunday and it's always the same, as soon as your brain shuts off, the idea comes. The title 'Song for the Summer' just entered my head. I went in the garden, wrote it from top to bottom, phoned Jamie and asked him what he was doing. So we went to the studio recorded it twice and that's the version on the record."

Track listing

Personnel

Stereophonics
 Kelly Jones - lead vocals, guitar
 Richard Jones - bass guitar
 Adam Zindani - guitar, backing vocals
 Jamie Morrison – drums

Additional
 Mikey Rowe – Wurly 
 David Arnold with Kelly Jones – orchestral arrangements 

Technical
 Production – Kelly Jones, Jim Lowe
 Engineering – Lowe
 Mixing – Craig Silvey
 Studio Assistant at ICP Studios – Paul Edouard-Laurendeau
 Mastering – Greg Calbi

Orchestra
 Leader – John Bradbury
 Violin section  – Eos Chater, Dorina Markoff, John Bradbury, Johnathan Strange, Oli Langford, Christina Emanuel, Tom Pigott-Smith, Jackie Hartley, Peter Hanson, Ralph De Souza, Johnathan Rees, David Woodcock, Debbie Widdup, Natalia Bonner
 Viola section  –Reiad Chibah, Julia Knight, Sue Dench, Nick Barr
 Cello section  – Nick Cooper, Chris Worsey, Adrian Bradbury, Frank Schaefer

Charts

References

2015 singles
2015 songs
Songs written by Kelly Jones
Stereophonics songs